Haltwhistle A69 Bridge, East is a concrete bridge across the River South Tyne at Haltwhistle in Northumberland, England.

History
The bridge is a concrete beam bridge, which forms part of the Haltwhistle bypass and was completed in 1994. The creation of the bypass allowed the road through Haltwhistle to be de-trunked shortly thereafter.

References

Bridges in Northumberland
Crossings of the River Tyne
Haltwhistle